Jason Bloom is an American film and television director.

His film credits include the short film Irving (1995) starring James Belushi, Bio-Dome (1996) starring Pauly Shore and Stephen Baldwin, Overnight Delivery (1998) starring Paul Rudd and Reese Witherspoon and Viva Las Nowhere (2001) starring James Caan and Daniel Stern.

In television, he has directed episodes of Soldier of Fortune, Inc., Veronica Mars and iZombie. Prior to directing, Bloom worked as a production assistant on the films Action Jackson (1988) and K-9 (1989).

References

External links
 

American film directors
American television directors
Living people
Place of birth missing (living people)
Year of birth missing (living people)